= Ancestral civilisation =

Ancient inhabitants of a modern country

Ancestral civilisation or ancestral people is a term used to refer to ancient inhabitants of a modern country, in which that civilisation had its center or birthplace. Although they lack the legal continuity of predecessor states, ancestral civilisations are foundational to the culture of contemporary states.

== See also ==
- Ancient history
